This  National Hockey League (NHL) players who have played at least one game in the NHL from 1917 to present and have a last name that starts with "M".

List updated as of the 2018–19 NHL season.

Maa–Mal

 Olli Maatta
 Al MacAdam
 Clarke MacArthur
 Kurtis MacDermid
 Lane MacDermid
 Paul MacDermid
 Blair MacDonald
 Brett MacDonald
 Craig MacDonald
 Doug MacDonald
 James "Kilby" MacDonald
 Jacob MacDonald
 Jason MacDonald
 Joey MacDonald
 Kevin MacDonald
 Lowell MacDonald
 Parker MacDonald
 Kim MacDougall
 Mackenzie MacEachern
 Shane MacEachern
 Maxime Macenauer
 Zack MacEwen
 Hubert Macey
 Bruce MacGregor
 Randy MacGregor
 Garth MacGuigan
 Spencer Machacek
 Raymond Macias
 Al MacInnis
 Ryan MacInnis
 Ian MacIntosh
 Drew MacIntyre
 Steve MacIntyre
 Don MacIver
 Norm Maciver
 Blair MacKasey
 Calum MacKay
 David MacKay
 Duncan "Mickey" MacKay
 Murdo MacKay
 Fleming Mackell
 Jack Mackell
 Aaron MacKenzie
 Barry MacKenzie
 Bill MacKenzie
 Clarence "Pudge" MacKenzie
 Derek MacKenzie
 Shawn MacKenzie
 Connor Mackey
 David Mackey
 Reg Mackey
 Howard Mackie
 Nathan MacKinnon
 Paul MacKinnon
 Brett MacLean
 Donald MacLean
 John MacLean
 Paul MacLean
 Rick MacLeish
 Brian MacLellan
 Pat MacLeod
 Bill MacMillan
 Bob MacMillan
 Jeff MacMillan
 John MacMillan
 Al MacNeil
 Bernie MacNeil
 Ian MacNeil
 Jamie Macoun
 Jim "Bud" MacPherson
 Ralph MacSweyn
 Craig MacTavish
 Andrew MacWilliam
 Mike MacWilliam
 John Madden
 Darrin Madeley
 Connie Madigan
 Jeff Madill
 Saku Maenalanen
 Dean Magee
 Darryl Maggs
 Marc Magnan
 Olivier Magnan
 Keith Magnuson
 Kevin Maguire
 Johnny Mahaffey
 Frank Mahovlich
 Pete Mahovlich
 Josh Mahura
 Jacques Mailhot
 Philippe Maillet
 Adam Mair
 Jim Mair
 Fern Majeau
 Ivan Majesky
 Bruce Major
 Mark Major
 Cale Makar
 Andrey Makarov
 Sergei Makarov
 Mikko Makela
 Ron "Chico" Maki
 Tomi Maki
 Wayne Maki
 Kari Makkonen
 Vladimir Malakhov
 Clint Malarchuk
 Tomas Malec
 Beck Malenstyn
 David Maley
 Denis Malgin
 Stewart Malgunas
 Manny Malhotra
 Marek Malik
 Merlin Malinowski
 Evgeni Malkin
 Dean Malkoc
 Troy Mallette
 Olli Malmivaara
 Cliff Malone
 Greg Malone
 Joe Malone
 Ryan Malone
 Sean Malone
 Dan Maloney
 Dave Maloney
 Don Maloney
 Phil Maloney
 Steve Maltais
 Kirk Maltby
 Mikhail Maltsev
 Ray Maluta

Mam–Maz

 Maxim Mamin
 Tom Manastersky
 Mark Mancari
 Felix "Gus" Mancuso
 Kent Manderville
 Dan Mandich
 George Maneluk
 Mike Maneluk
 Kris Manery
 Randy Manery
 Andrew Mangiapane
 Cesare Maniago
 Eric Manlow
 Cameron Mann
 Jackie Mann
 Jimmy Mann
 Ken Mann
 Norman Mann
 Rennison "Ren" Manners
 Brandon Manning
 Paul Manning
 Peter Mannino
 Bob Manno
 Dave Manson
 Josh Manson
 Ray Manson
 Anthony Mantha
 Georges Mantha
 Moe Mantha
 Sylvio Mantha
 Justin Mapletoft
 Paul Mara
 Henry "Buddy" Maracle
 Norm Maracle
 Milan Marcetta
 Harold "Mush" March
 Brad Marchand
 Todd Marchant
 Alexei Marchenko
 Jonathan Marchessault
 Brian Marchinko
 Bryan Marchment
 Mason Marchment
 Dave Marcinyshyn
 Lou Marcon
 Don Marcotte
 Josef Marha
 Martin Marinčin
 Hector Marini
 John Marino
 Chris Marinucci
 Frank Mario
 John Mariucci
 Masi Marjamaki
 Gord Mark
 John Markell
 Gus Marker
 Ray Markham
 Jussi Markkanen
 Jack Markle
 Andrei Markov
 Danny Markov
 Jack Marks
 John Marks
 Nevin Markwart
 Patrick Marleau
 Mitch Marner
 Cooper Marody
 Daniel Marois
 Jean Marois
 Mario Marois
 Patrick Maroon
 Gilles Marotte
 Mark Marquess
 Brad Marsh
 Gary Marsh
 Peter Marsh
 Bert Marshall
 Don Marshall
 Grant Marshall
 Jason Marshall
 Kevin Marshall
 Paul Marshall
 Willie Marshall
 Mike Marson
 Danick Martel
 Tony Martensson
 Clare Martin
 Craig Martin
 Frank Martin
 Grant Martin
 Hubert "Pit" Martin
 Jack Martin
 Matt Martin (born 1971)
 Matt Martin (born 1989)
 Paul Martin
 Rick Martin
 Ronnie Martin
 Seth Martin
 Spencer Martin
 Terry Martin
 Tom Martin
 Tom R. Martin
 Don Martineau
 Radek Martinek
 Alec Martinez
 Darcy Martini
 Jordan Martinook
 Steve Martins
 Andreas Martinsen
 Steve Martinson
 Dennis Maruk
 Brandon Mashinter
 Paul Masnick
 Bob Mason
 Charlie Mason
 Chris Mason
 Steve Mason
 George Massecar
 Jamie Masters
 Bill Masterton
 Frank Mathers
 Mike Matheson
 Dwight Mathiasen
 Jim Mathieson
 Marquis Mathieu
 Jonathan Matsumoto
 Christian Matte
 Joe Matte (born 1893)
 Joe Matte (born 1908)
 Roland Matte
 Stefan Matteau
 Stephane Matteau
 Mike Matteucci
 Auston Matthews
 Shawn Matthias
 Dick Mattiussi
 Markus Mattsson
 Richard Matvichuk
 Johnny Matz
 Greg Mauldin
 Wayne Maxner
 Ben Maxwell
 Brad Maxwell
 Bryan Maxwell
 Kevin Maxwell
 Wally Maxwell
 Alan May
 Brad May
 Darrell May
 Derek Mayer
 Gil Mayer
 Jim Mayer
 Pat Mayer
 Shep Mayer
 Jamal Mayers
 Scott Mayfield
 Gerald Mayhew
 Maxim Mayorov
 Marek Mazanec
 Eddie Mazur
 Jay Mazur

Mc

 Gary McAdam
 Sam McAdam
 Chris McAllister
 Chris McAlpine
 Dean McAmmond
 Hazen McAndrew
 Ted McAneeley
 Jerome "Jud" McAtee
 Norm McAtee
 Ken McAuley
 Charlie McAvoy
 Andrew McBain
 Jamie McBain
 Jason McBain
 Mike McBain
 Wayne McBean
 Cliff McBride
 Jim McBurney
 Bryan McCabe
 Jake McCabe
 Stan McCabe
 Bert McCaffrey
 John McCahill
 Mike McCall
 Dunc McCallum
 Eddie McCalmon
 Jared McCann
 Rick McCann
 Michael McCarron
 Jack McCartan
 Dan McCarthy
 Kevin McCarthy
 Sandy McCarthy
 Steve McCarthy
 Tom McCarthy (born 1893)
 Tom McCarthy (born 1934)
 Tom McCarthy (born 1960)
 Walter McCartney
 Darren McCarty
 Ted McCaskill
 Alyn McCauley
 Rob McClanahan
 Trent McCleary
 Dave McClelland
 Kevin McClelland
 Jay McClement
 Tom McCollum
 Frank McCool
 Bob McCord
 Dennis McCord
 John McCormack
 Cody McCormick
 Max McCormick
 Shawn McCosh
 Ian McCoshen
 Dale McCourt
 Bill McCreary Sr.
 Bill McCreary Jr.
 Keith McCreary
 John McCreedy
 Brad McCrimmon
 Jim McCrimmon
 Bob McCully
 Duke McCurry
 Brian McCutcheon
 Darwin McCutcheon
 Connor McDavid
 Jeff McDill
 Bill McDonagh
 Ryan McDonagh
 Ab McDonald
 Andy McDonald
 Bob McDonald
 Brian McDonald
 Byron "Butch" McDonald
 Colin McDonald
 Gerry McDonald
 Jack McDonald (born 1921)
 Jack McDonald (born 1887)
 Lanny McDonald
 Terry McDonald
 Wilfred "Bucko" McDonald
 Kent McDonell
 Joe McDonnell
 Moylan McDonnell
 Al McDonough
 Hubie McDonough
 Bill McDougall
 Mike McDougall
 Peter McDuffe
 Shawn McEachern
 Curtis McElhinney
 Jim McElmury
 Evan McEneny
 Mike McEwen
 Jim McFadden
 Don McFadyen
 Dan McFall
 John McFarland
 Gord McFarlane
 Jim McGeough
 Irving McGibbon
 Bob McGill
 Jack McGill (born 1909)
 Jack McGill (born 1921)
 Ryan McGill
 Dan McGillis
 Brock McGinn
 Jamie McGinn
 Tye McGinn
 Brian McGrattan
 Tom McGratton
 Donald "Sandy" McGregor
 Frank "Mickey" McGuire
 Mike McHugh
 Jack McIlhargey
 Dylan McIlrath
 Bert McInenly
 Marty McInnis
 Bruce McIntosh
 Paul McIntosh
 David McIntyre
 Jack McIntyre
 John McIntyre
 Larry McIntyre
 Zane McIntyre
 Nathan McIver
 Doug McKay
 Randy McKay
 Ray McKay
 Ross McKay
 Scott McKay
 Walt McKechnie
 Jay McKee
 Mike McKee
 Greg McKegg
 Ian McKegney
 Tony McKegney
 Alex McKendry
 Mike McKenna
 Sean McKenna
 Steve McKenna
 Don McKenney
 Jim McKenny
 Bill McKenzie
 Brian McKenzie
 Curtis McKenzie
 Jim McKenzie
 John McKenzie
 Roland McKeown
 Steve McKichan
 Andrew McKim
 Alex McKinnon
 Johnny McKinnon
 Murray McLachlan
 Frazer McLaren
 Kyle McLaren
 Steve McLaren
 Brett McLean
 Don McLean
 Fred McLean
 Jack McLean
 Jeff McLean
 Kirk McLean
 Kurtis McLean
 John McLellan
 Scott McLellan
 Todd McLellan
 Rollie McLenahan
 Jamie McLennan
 Al McLeod
 Cody McLeod
 Don McLeod
 Jackie McLeod
 Jimmy McLeod
 Michael McLeod
 Dave McLlwain
 Mike McMahon Sr.
 Mike McMahon Jr.
 Bob McManama
 Sammy McManus
 Connor McMichael
 Brandon McMillan
 Carson McMillan
 Sean McMorrow
 Tom McMurchy
 Max McNab
 Peter McNab
 Brayden McNabb
 Sid McNabney
 Gerry McNamara
 Howard McNamara
 George McNaughton
 Gerry McNeil
 Billy McNeill
 Grant McNeill
 Mark McNeill
 Mike McNeill
 Stu McNeill
 George McPhee
 Mike McPhee
 Adam McQuaid
 Basil McRae
 Chris McRae
 Gord McRae
 Ken McRae
 Phil McRae
 Pat McReavy
 Brian McReynolds
 Bryan McSheffrey
 Marty McSorley
 Don McSween
 Jim McTaggart
 Dale McTavish
 Gord McTavish
 Charles "Rabbit" McVeigh
 Jack "Pop" McVicar
 Rob McVicar

Me

 Rick Meagher
 Evgeny Medvedev
 Gerry Meehan
 Brent Meeke
 Howie Meeker
 Mike Meeker
 Harry Meeking
 Wade Megan
 Paul Meger
 Jaycob Megna
 Jayson Megna
 Timo Meier
 Ron Meighan
 Barrie Meissner
 Dick Meissner
 Anssi Melametsa
 Dean Melanson
 Rollie Melanson
 Julian Melchiori
 Josef Melichar
 Bjorn Melin
 Roger Melin
 Scott Mellanby
 Tom Mellor
 Alexei Melnichuk
 Gerry Melnyk
 Larry Melnyk
 Eric Meloche
 Gilles Meloche
 Nicolas Meloche
 Barry Melrose
 Hillary "Minnie" Menard
 Howie Menard
 Brennan Menell
 Justin Mercier
 Vic Mercredi
 Greg Meredith
 Nicholas Merkley
 Glenn Merkosky
 Dakota Mermis
 William "Smiley" Meronek
 Wayne Merrick
 Horace Merrill
 Jon Merrill
 Michael Mersch
 Jan Mertzig
 Elvis Merzlikins 
 Eric Messier
 Joby Messier
 Mark Messier
 Mitch Messier
 Paul Messier
 Andrej Meszaros
 Scott Metcalfe
 Victor Mete
 Marc Methot
 Glen Metropolit
 Don Metz
 Nick Metz
 Freddy Meyer
 Stefan Meyer
 Branislav Mezei

Mi

 Corrado Micalef
 Marc Michaelis
 Milan Michalek
 Zbynek Michalek
 Arthur Michaluk
 John Michaluk
 Alfie Michaud
 Olivier Michaud
 Dave Michayluk
 Joe Micheletti
 Pat Micheletti
 Larry Mickey
 Nick Mickoski
 Max Middendorf
 Lindsay Middlebrook
 Jacob Middleton
 Keaton Middleton
 Rick Middleton
 Kevin Miehm
 Andy Miele
 Antti Miettinen
 Rudy Migay
 Vladimir Mihalik
 Petr Mika
 Ilya Mikheyev
 Alexei Mikhnov
 Stan Mikita
 Bill Mikkelson
 Brendan Mikkelson
 Niko Mikkola
 Jim Mikol
 Oleg Mikulchik
 Sonny Milano
 Mike Milbury
 Hib Milks
 Al Millar
 Craig Millar
 Hugh Millar
 Mike Millar
 Corey Millen
 Greg Millen
 Aaron Miller
 Andrew Miller
 Bill Miller
 Bob Miller
 Brad Miller
 Colin Miller
 Drew Miller
 Earl Miller
 J. T. Miller
 Jack Miller
 Jason Miller
 Jay Miller
 Joe Miller
 K'Andre Miller
 Kelly Miller
 Kevan Miller
 Kevin Miller
 Kip Miller
 Paul Miller
 Perry Miller
 Ryan Miller
 Tom Miller
 Warren Miller
 Norm Milley
 Brad Mills
 Craig Mills
 Duncan Milroy
 Chris Minard
 Mike Minard
 John Miner
 Graham Mink
 Gerry Minor
 Eddie Mio
 Andrei Mironov
 Boris Mironov
 Dmitri Mironov
 Hunter Miska
 John Miszuk
 Bill "Red" Mitchell
 Bill Mitchell
 Garrett Mitchell
 Herb Mitchell
 Ian Mitchell
 Ivan Mitchell
 Jeff Mitchell
 John Mitchell
 Roy Mitchell
 Torrey Mitchell
 Willie Mitchell
 Zack Mitchell
 Casey Mittelstadt

Mo–Mr

 Mike Modano
 Fredrik Modin
 Jaroslav Modry
 Bill Moe
 Travis Moen
 Lyle Moffat
 Mike Moffat
 Ron Moffat
 Sandy Moger
 Alexander Mogilny
 Mike Moher
 Doug Mohns
 Lloyd Mohns
 Tomas Mojzis
 Carl Mokosak
 John Mokosak
 Lars Molin
 Griffen Molino
 Mike Moller
 Oscar Moller
 Randy Moller
 Mitch Molloy
 Larry Molyneaux
 Sergio Momesso
 Garry Monahan
 Hartland Monahan
 Sean Monahan
 Armand Mondou
 Pierre Mondou
 Michel Mongeau
 Bob Mongrain
 Steve Montador
 Hank Monteith
 Sam Montembeault
 Jim Montgomery
 Brandon Montour
 Al Montoya
 Andy Moog
 Alfie Moore
 Barrie Moore
 Dickie Moore
 Dominic Moore
 Greg Moore
 John Moore
 Mike Moore
 Robbie Moore
 Steve Moore
 Trevor Moore
 Amby Moran
 Brad Moran
 Ian Moran
 David Moravec
 Jayson More
 Ethan Moreau
 Howie Morenz
 Angie Moretto
 Gavin Morgan
 Jason Morgan
 Jeremy Morin
 Pete Morin
 Samuel Morin
 Stephane Morin
 Travis Morin
 David Morisset
 Dave Morissette
 Jean-Guy Morissette
 Joey Mormina
 Marc Moro
 Alexei Morozov
 Bernie Morris
 Derek Morris
 Elwyn "Moe" Morris
 Jon Morris
 Brendan Morrison
 Dave Morrison
 Don Morrison
 Doug Morrison
 Gary Morrison
 George Morrison
 Jim Morrison
 John "Crutchy" Morrison
 Kevin Morrison
 Lew Morrison
 Mark Morrison
 Mike Morrison
 Rod Morrison
 Shaone Morrisonn
 Josh Morrissey
 Brenden Morrow
 Joe Morrow
 Ken Morrow
 Scott Morrow
 Dean Morton
 Gus Mortson
 Ken Mosdell
 Simon Moser
 Bill Mosienko
 David Moss
 Tyler Moss
 Johan Motin
 Morris Mott
 Mike Mottau
 Tyler Motte
 Alex Motter
 Joe Motzko
 Kael Mouillierat 
 Matt Moulson
 Johnny Mowers
 Mark Mowers
 Jim Moxey
 Vojtech Mozik
 Jerome Mrazek
 Petr Mrazek
 Rick Mrozik

Mu–My

 Bill Muckalt
 Marcel Mueller
 Mirco Mueller
 Peter Mueller
 Bryan Muir
 Richard Mulhern
 Ryan Mulhern
 Brian Mullen
 Joe Mullen
 Kirk Muller
 Wayne Muloin
 Glenn Mulvenna
 Grant Mulvey
 Paul Mulvey
 Harry Mummery
 Craig Muni
 Adam Munro
 Dunc Munro
 Gerald Munro
 Bob Murdoch (born 1946)
 Bob Murdoch (born 1954)
 Don Murdoch
 Murray Murdoch
 Matt Murley
 Brian Murphy
 Connor Murphy
 Cory Murphy
 Curtis Murphy
 Gord Murphy
 Hal Murphy
 Joe Murphy
 Larry Murphy
 Mike Murphy (born 1950)
 Mike Murphy (born 1989)
 Rob Murphy
 Ron Murphy
 Ryan Murphy
 Trevor Murphy
 Al Murray
 Andrew Murray
 Bob Murray (born 1954)
 Bob Murray (born 1948)
 Brady Murray
 Chris Murray
 Doug Murray
 Garth Murray
 Glen Murray
 Jim Murray
 Ken Murray
 Leo Murray
 Marty Murray
 Matt Murray
 Mickey Murray
 Mike Murray
 Pat Murray
 Randy Murray
 Rem Murray
 Rob Murray
 Ryan Murray
 Terry Murray
 Troy Murray
 Jan Mursak
 Dana Murzyn
 David Musil
 Frank Musil
 Jason Muzzatti
 Jake Muzzin
 Hap Myers
 Philippe Myers
 Tyler Myers
 Brantt Myhres
 Vic Myles
 Jarmo Myllys
 Sergei Mylnikov
 Phil Myre
 Anders Myrvold

See also
 hockeydb.com NHL Player List - M

Players